The 1953 winners of the Torneo di Viareggio (in English, the Viareggio Tournament, officially the Viareggio Cup World Football Tournament Coppa Carnevale), the annual youth football tournament held in Viareggio, Tuscany, are listed below.

Format
The 16 teams are organized in knockout rounds, all played single tie.

Participating teams

Italian teams

  Atalanta
  Bologna
  Fiorentina
  Juventus
  Lazio
  Milan
  Sampdoria
  Udinese
  Viareggio

European teams

  Austria Wien
  Offenbach
  Hamburg
  Stade de Reims
  Bordeaux
  Hajduk Split
  Partizan Beograd

Tournament fixtures

Champions

Footnotes

External links
 Official Site (Italian)
 Results on RSSSF.com

1953
1952–53 in Italian football
1952–53 in French football
1952–53 in Yugoslav football
1952–53 in Austrian football
1952–53 in German football